Karacaören-1 Dam is a dam in Turkey. Its development was backed by the Turkish State Hydraulic Works.

See also

List of dams and reservoirs in Turkey

References
DSI directory, State Hydraulic Works (Turkey), Retrieved December 16, 2009

Dams in Burdur Province
Hydroelectric power stations in Turkey